Marco Ritzberger (born 27 December 1986) is a retired Liechtensteiner football defender who last recently played for FC Vaduz.

At the age of 22, Ritzberger had played 7 games in UEFA Euro 2008 qualifying and once in 2006 FIFA World Cup qualifying.

Career statistics

International goals

References

External links

 

1986 births
Living people
Liechtenstein international footballers
FC Vaduz players
Association football defenders
Liechtenstein footballers
People from Vaduz